Acrolophus mycetophagus, commonly known as the frilly grass tubeworm moth, is a moth of the family Acrolophidae. It was described by Davis in 1990. It is found in the southern United States from Virginia and Florida to Texas.

The wingspan is 16–17 mm.

The larvae are thought to feed on fungi.

References

Moths described in 1990
mycetophagus